The Men's lightweight four event at the 2010 South American Games was held over March 22 at 11:20.

Medalists

Records

Results

References
Final

Lightweight Four M